Ingush (pronounced ) is a Northeast Caucasian language spoken by about 500,000 people, known as the Ingush, across a region covering the Russian republics of Ingushetia and Chechnya.

Classification
Ingush and Chechen, together with Bats, constitute the Nakh branch of the Northeast Caucasian language family. There is pervasive passive bilingualism between Ingush and Chechen.

Geographic distribution
Ingush is spoken by about 413,000 people (2002), primarily across a region in the Caucasus covering parts of Russia, primarily Ingushetia and Chechnya. Speakers can also be found in Kazakhstan, Uzbekistan, Turkmenistan, Belgium, Norway, Turkey and Jordan.

Official status
Ingush is, alongside Russian, an official language of Ingushetia, a federal subject of Russia.

Writing system
Ingush became a written language with an Arabic-based writing system at the beginning of the 20th century. After the October Revolution it first used a Latin alphabet, which was later replaced by Cyrillic.

Phonology

Vowels 

The diphthongs are иэ /ie/, уо /uo/, оа , ий /ij/, эи /ei/, ои /oi/, уи /ui/, ов /ow/, ув /uw/.

Consonants 

The consonants of Ingush are as follows, including the Latin orthography developed by Johanna Nichols:

Dialects
Ingush is not divided into dialects with the exception of Galain-Ch'azh (native name: Галайн-ЧӀаж), which is considered to be transitional between Chechen and Ingush.

Grammar
Ingush is a nominative–accusative language in its syntax, though it has ergative morphology.

Case
The most recent and in-depth analysis of the language shows eight cases: absolutive, ergative, genitive, dative, allative, instrumental, lative and comparative.

Tenses

Numerals
Like many Northeast Caucasian languages, Ingush uses a vigesimal system, where numbers lower than twenty are counted as in a base-ten system, but higher decads are base-twenty.

 Note that "four" and its derivatives begin with noun-class marker. d- is merely the default value.

Pronouns

Word order
In Ingush, "for main clauses, other than episode-initial and other all-new ones, verb-second order is most common. The verb, or the finite part of a compound verb or analytic tense form (i.e. the light verb or the auxiliary), follows the first word or phrase in the clause".

References

External links

Appendix:Cyrillic script
Indigenous Language of the Caucasus (Ingush)
Ingush Language Project at UC Berkeley
University of Graz report 
Russian-Ghalghaj (Ingush) vocabulary
Ingush 100-word Swadesh list at the Global Lexicostatistical Database

 
Northeast Caucasian languages
Languages of Russia
Languages of Kazakhstan